The 2018 season was Western Storm's third season, in which they competed in the Women's Cricket Super League, a Twenty20 competition. The side finished second in the initial group stage, therefore progressing to the semi-final. However, they lost in the semi-final to the eventual winners Surrey Stars by 9 runs.

The side was captained by Heather Knight and coached by Trevor Griffin. They played three home matches at the County Ground, Taunton and one apiece at the County Ground, Bristol and College Ground, Cheltenham.

Squad
Western Storm announced their full 15-player squad for the season on 17 July 2018. Age given is at the start of Western Storm's first match of the season (22 July 2018).

Women's Cricket Super League

Season standings

 Advanced to the final
 Advanced to the semi-final

League stage

Semi-final

Statistics

Batting

Bowling

Fielding

Wicket-keeping

References

Western Storm seasons
2018 in English women's cricket